Niilam Paanchal (also spelled Nilam Panchal or Neelam Panchal) is an Indian film and television actress. She appeared in several television series including Hamari Devrani, Ruk Jaana Nahin, Ek Veer Ki Ardaas...Veera, Lajwanti, and Ishqbaaaz. She acted in the 2019 Gujarati film Hellaro, for which she won Special Jury Award at the 66th National Film Awards.

Biography
Niilam studied at H. L College of Commerce, Ahmedabad. Initially she appeared in several Gujarati language television shows including Ek Daal Na Pankhi on Doordarshan, Pati Patni Ane Vavajodu, Geet Gunjan, Yuva Sangram, Parnya Atle Pati Gaya on ETV Gujarati, and Saraswatichandra on Zee Gujarati.

She made her film debut with the 2007 Gujarati film Sneh Na Sagpan. In 2019, She acted in Gujarati period drama film Hellaro, which won the National Film Award for Best Feature Film at the 66th National Film Awards and she earned Special Jury Award for her performance. The film has been theatrically released in India on 8 November 2019 to positive reviews and her acting is appreciated by the audiences.

She appeared in several Hindi television series including Hamari Devrani, Ruk Jaana Nahin, Ek Veer Ki Ardaas...Veera, Lajwanti, and Ishqbaaaz. In 2020, she played Parul, a Gujarati woman character, in the Marathi language television series Vaiju No. 1.

She played Kasturba Gandhi in the play Bharat Bhagyavidhata. She made her debut in Hindi cinema with the 2017 film Kaabil.

Presently, she is working in her next film Ekvismu Tiffin, directed by Vijaygiri Bava, which is set to release in 2021.

Awards and Accolades

Filmography

Films

Television

References

External links
 

Living people
Gujarati people
Actresses in Gujarati cinema
Special Jury Award (feature film) National Film Award winners
Indian actresses
Year of birth missing (living people)